The New South Wales Court of Criminal Appeal, part of the Supreme Court of New South Wales, is the highest court for criminal matters and has appellate jurisdiction in the Australian State of New South Wales.

Jurisdiction
The Court hears appeals from people who were convicted or pleaded guilty and were sentenced by a Supreme or District court judge. The Court also hears appeals lodged by The Crown regarding the adequacy of a sentence. Decisions made by the Land and Environment Court, the Industrial Court or the Drug Court in criminal jurisdiction may also be brought for appeal. The Court of Criminal Appeal may also grant leave to appeal in matters involving questions of fact or mixed questions of fact and law. It may also grant leave to appeal in cases where the severity or adequacy of the sentence is challenged.

If a petitioner is not satisfied with the decision made by the Court of Criminal Appeal, application may be made to the High Court of Australia for special leave to appeal the decision before the High Court.

Composition
Three judges usually form the panel for appeals, although five judges can be used for significant legal issues. The Chief Justice has ultimate discretion in determining the number of judges to sit on the Bench, and the selection of individual judges for each case.  A unanimous decision is not needed as the majority view will prevail. The presiding judge is usually one of the Chief Justice, the President of the Court of Appeal, a Judges of Appeal or the Chief Judge at Common Law. Typically each bench comprises at least two judges of the Common Law Division. Single judges hear sentence appeals from the Drug Court.

The Judges who may typically be the presiding judge are listed below:

Caseload
In 2018, the Court heard 407 new cases, which included 265 appeals against severity of sentence, 108 appeals against conviction, 19 appeals against interlocutory judgments and 1 case returned from the High Court for re-hearing. Appeals against convictions were approximately 27 per cent in 2018 and, in recent years have showed a trend towards increasing complexity, impacting on Court time and resources.

See also

List of New South Wales courts and tribunals

References

External links
Court of Criminal Appeal Judgements

New South Wales courts and tribunals
Criminal Appeal
New South Wales